Shinelle Proctor (born 27 June 1991) is an Anguillan sprinter. She competed in the 60 metres event at the 2014 IAAF World Indoor Championships. Her older sister is the Anguillian long-jumper Shara Proctor.

References

External links
 Illinois Fighting Illini bio

1991 births
Living people
Anguillan female sprinters
Place of birth missing (living people)
Commonwealth Games competitors for Anguilla
Athletes (track and field) at the 2014 Commonwealth Games
People from The Valley, Anguilla
Illinois Fighting Illini women's track and field athletes